The History of the Caucasian Albanians (or The History of the World of Aghvank) by Movses Kaghankatvatsi is a history of eastern territories of Armenia (Artsakh and Utik), as well as other territories in Southeastern Caucasus usually described as Caucasian Albania. The work was written in Old Armenian. It covers the period between 4th century AD and 10th century AD.

Publications & translations

References 
 The History of the Caucasian Albanians by Movses Dasxuranci (a.k.a. Moses Kałankatuaçi; tr. C.J.F. Dowsett,Oxford, 1961)
 A Neglected Passage in the "History of the Caucasian Albanians", C. J. F. Dowsett, Bulletin of the School of Oriental and African Studies, University of London, Vol. 19, No. 3 (1957), pp. 456–468

Caucasian Albania